Ragweed leaf beetle may refer to either of two leaf beetles in the family Chrysomelidae:

 Ophraella communa
 Zygogramma suturalis, native to North America